Pascal Elso is a French actor.

Life
He is actor, comedian, director and acting teacher on several cinema school. He had been choreographer, clown, mime

Filmography

Theater

References

External links 

French male film actors
Living people
20th-century French male actors
21st-century French male actors
French male stage actors
French male television actors
Year of birth missing (living people)